The Deoband School And The Demand For Pakistan a research book by Ziaul Hasan Farooqi, Professor of Jamia Millia Islamia. The book was published in 1963 by Asia Publishing House, New Delhi. It was originally an MA thesis by the author, completed in 1959 at McGill University. The book corrects a misreading in England about the recent Muslim history of India. The book gained popularity within a short period of its publication, which had a significant impact on the policy making of India at that time.

Content 
The book has a total of 4 chapters. It begins with a discussion of Muslim history in India from 1800 to Indian Rebellion of 1857 and the role of Muslim clerics in it. The establishment of Darul Uloom Deoband after Rebellion is the second topic. Jamiat Ulema-e-Hind was established in the sixth decade of the establishment of Darul Uloom Deoband, which is the third topic of discussion in the book. In the last chapter the author discusses the creation of Pakistan movement and the role of Jamiat in it. The author ignores the long history of Muslim nationalism before the rise of the Muslim League and this was closely associated with nationalism of the Congress. He showed how Darul Uloom Deoband, unlike the Muslim League, became a training ground for Composite nationalism.

See also 
Islamic Revival in British India: Deoband, 1860-1900
Revival from Below: The Deoband Movement and Global Islam

References

External links 

1963 non-fiction books
Indian books
Deobandi literature
1963 books
English-language books
History of Islam
Works about Darul Uloom Deoband